This is a list of biker metal bands. Biker metal is a fusion genre of punk rock, heavy metal, rock and roll, and blues.

List 

The Almighty
Anti-Nowhere League
Black Label Society
Black Moth
Chrome Division
Girlschool
The Godz
The Gone Jackals
Earthride 
High Rise
Iggy Pop
Kïll Cheerleadër
Kylesa
Loudmouth
Malignant Tumour
Metallica
Motörhead
The Obsessed
Orange Goblin
Plasmatics
Axel Rudi Pell
Rogue Male
Saxon
Sea Hags
Spread Eagle
Steve Jones
Tank
Turbonegro
Tygers of Pan Tang
Zodiac Mindwarp and the Love Reaction

References

Biker metal